The Miseducation of Lauryn Hill is the debut solo album by American singer and rapper Lauryn Hill. It was released on August 25, 1998, by Ruffhouse Records and Columbia Records. The Miseducation of Lauryn Hill is a neo soul and R&B album with some songs based in hip hop soul and reggae. Its lyrics touch upon Hill's pregnancy and the turmoil within her former group the Fugees, along with themes of love and God. The album's title was inspired by the film and autobiographical novel The Education of Sonny Carson, and Carter G. Woodson's The Mis-Education of the Negro.

After touring with the Fugees, Hill became involved in a romantic relationship with Jamaican entrepreneur Rohan Marley, and shortly after, became pregnant with their child. This pregnancy, as well as other circumstances in her life, inspired Hill to make a solo album. Recording sessions for the album took place from late 1997 to June 1998 mainly at Tuff Gong Studios in Kingston, as Hill collaborated with a group of musicians known as New Ark in writing and producing the songs.

The album debuted at number one on the Billboard 200 chart, selling over 422,000 copies in its first week, which broke a record for first-week sales by a female artist. It was promoted with the release of the hit singles "Doo Wop (That Thing)", "Ex-Factor", and "Everything Is Everything", while "Lost Ones" and "Can't Take My Eyes Off You" were released as promotional singles. To further promote the album, Hill made televised performances on Saturday Night Live and the Billboard Music Awards before embarking on a sold-out, worldwide concert tour.

The Miseducation of Lauryn Hill was among the most acclaimed albums of 1998, as most critics praised Hill's presentation of a woman's view on life and love, along with her artistic range. At the 41st Annual Grammy Awards, The Miseducation of Lauryn Hill earned 10 nominations, winning five awards, making Hill the first woman to receive that many nominations and awards in one night. The album's success propelled Hill to international superstardom, and contributed to bringing hip hop and neo soul to the forefront of popular music. New Ark, however, felt Hill and her record label did not properly credit the group on the album; a lawsuit filed by the group was settled out of court in 2001.

Since its release, the album has been ranked in numerous best-album lists, with a number of critics regarding it as one of the greatest albums of the 1990s, as well as one of the greatest albums of all time. Among its honors are inclusion in Rolling Stone magazine's 500 Greatest Albums of All Time list, Harvard University's Loeb Music Library, the Smithsonian National Museum of African American history, and the Library of Congress' National Recording Registry. In 2021, the album was certified Diamond by the Recording Industry Association of America, for estimated sales of 10 million copies in the US, making Hill the first female rapper to accomplish this feat. Worldwide, the album has sold over 20 million copies, making it one of the best-selling albums of all time, the best-selling album by a female rapper, and the best-selling neo-soul album of all time. It remains Hill's only studio album.

Background
In 1996, Lauryn Hill met Rohan Marley while touring as a member of the Fugees. The two gradually formed a close relationship, and while on tour, Hill became pregnant with his child. The pregnancy and other circumstances in her life inspired her to record a solo album. After contributing to fellow Fugees member Wyclef Jean's 1997 solo record Wyclef Jean Presents The Carnival, Hill took time off from touring and recording due to her pregnancy and cases of writer's block. This pregnancy, however, renewed Hill's creativity, as she recalled in an interview several years later: "When some women are pregnant, their hair and their nails grow, but for me it was my mind and ability to create. I had the desire to write in a capacity that I hadn't done in a while. I don't know if it's a hormonal or emotional thing ... I was very in touch with my feelings at the time." Of the early writing process, Hill said, "Every time I got hurt, every time I was disappointed, every time I learned, I just wrote a song."

While inspired, Hill wrote over thirty songs in her attic studio in South Orange, New Jersey. Many of these songs drew upon the turbulence in the Fugees, as well as past love experiences. In the summer of 1997, as Hill was due to give birth to her first child, she was requested to write a song for gospel musician CeCe Winans. Several months later, she went to Detroit to work with soul singer Aretha Franklin, writing and producing her single "A Rose is Still a Rose". Franklin would later have Hill direct the song's music video. Shortly after this, Hill did writing work for Whitney Houston. Having written songs for artists in gospel, hip hop, and R&B, she drew on these influences and experiences to record The Miseducation of Lauryn Hill.

Recording and production 

Hill began recording The Miseducation in late 1997 at Chung King Studios in New York City, and completed it in June 1998 at Tuff Gong Studios in Kingston, Jamaica. In an interview, Hill described the first day of recording, stating: "The first day in the studio I ordered every instrument I ever fell in love with: harps, strings, timpani, organs, clarinets. It was my idea to record it so the human element stayed in. I didn't want it to be too technically perfect." Initially, Jean did not support Hill recording a solo album, but eventually offered to help as a producer, which she did not accept. Aside from doing work at Chung King Studios, Hill also recorded at Perfect Pair Studios in New Jersey, as well as Sony Studios, with some songs having different elements recorded at different studios. The bulk of the album, however, was recorded at Tuff Gong Studios in Kingston, Jamaica, the studio built by reggae musician Bob Marley. Regarding this shift in environment, Hill stated: "When I started recording in New York and New Jersey, lots of people were talking to me about going different routes. I could feel people up in my face, and I was picking up on bad vibes. I wanted a place where there was good vibes, where I was among family, and it was Tuff Gong." Many members of the Marley family were present in the studio during the recording sessions, among them Julian Marley, who added guitar elements to "Forgive Them Father."

In an interview, recording engineer Gordon "Commissioner Gordon" Williams recalled the recording of "Lost Ones", stating: "It was our first morning in Jamaica and I saw all of these kids gathered around Lauryn, screaming and dancing. Lauryn was in the living room next to the studio with about fifteen Marley grandchildren around her, the children of Ziggy, and Stephen, and Julian, and she starts singing this rap verse, and all the kids start repeating the last word of each line, chiming in very spontaneously because they were so into the song." Columbia Records considered bringing in an outside producer for the album and had early talks with RZA of the Wu-Tang Clan. However, Hill was adamant about writing, arranging, and producing the album herself: "It would have been more difficult to articulate to other people. Hey, it's my album. Who can tell my story better than me?" She recalled Ruffhouse Records executive Chris Swartz ensuring her artistic freedom while recording the album: "I had total control of the album. Chris Swartz at Ruffhouse, my label, said, 'Listen, you've never done anything stupid thus far, so let me let you do your thing.'"

Music and lyrics 

The Miseducation of Lauryn Hill is considered a neo soul album, according to Christopher John Farley of Time and Rhapsody writer Mosi Reeves; Complex magazine refers to it more generally as R&B. Its music incorporates styles such as soul, hip hop, and reggae, with some songs based in hip hop soul, according to the Encyclopedia of African American Music (2010). "When It Hurts So Bad" is musically old roots reggae mixed with soul. While mostly in English, "Forgive Them Father" and "Lost Ones" both feature singing in patois, which is the common dialect in Jamaica. Although heavily R&B, the song "Superstar" contains an interpolation of the rock song "Light My Fire" by The Doors. Hill said that she "didn't want to come out with a [Fugees] type of sound", but create "something that was uniquely and very clearly a Lauryn Hill album." She also said that she did not intend for the album's sound to be commercially appealing: "There's too much pressure to have hits these days. Artists are watching Billboard instead of exploring themselves. Look at someone like Aretha, she didn't hit with her first album, but she was able to grow up and find herself. I wanted to make honest music. I don't like things to be too perfect, or too polished. People may criticize me for that, but I grew up listening to Al Green and Sam Cooke. When they hit a high note, you actually felt it."

Much of Hill's lyrics dealt with motherhood, the Fugees, reminiscence, love, heartbreak, and God. Commenting on the album's gospel content, Hill stated "Gospel music is music inspired by the gospels. In a huge respect, a lot of this music turned out to be just that. During this album, I turned to the Bible and wrote songs that I drew comfort from." Several of the album's songs, such as "Lost Ones," "Superstar," "Ex-Factor" and "Forgive Them Father" were widely speculated as direct attacks at Fugee members Wyclef and Pras. "Ex-Factor" was originally intended for a different artist, however, Hill decided to keep it after it was completed, due to its personal content. Although a large portion of the album's love songs would turn out to be bitter from Hill's previous relationship, "Nothing Even Matters," a duet performed by Hill and R&B singer D'Angelo, showcased a brighter, more intimate perspective on the subject. The song was inspired by Hill's relationship with Rohan Marley. Speaking about "Nothing Even Matters"' lyrics, Hill remarked: "I wanted to make a love song, á la Roberta Flack & Donny Hathaway, and give people a humanistic approach to love again without all the physicality and overt sexuality."

"To Zion," among the more introspective tracks on the album, spoke about how Hill's family comes before her career and her decision to have her first child, even though many at the time encouraged her to abort the pregnancy, so as to not conflict with her burgeoning career. In an interview she discussed the song's origin and significance, commenting "Names wouldn't come when I was ready to have him. The only name that came to me was Zion. I was like, 'is Zion too much of a weight to carry?' But this little boy, man. I would say he personally delivered me from my emotional and spiritual drought. He just replenished my newness. When he was born, I felt like I was born again." She further stated: "I wanted it to be a revolutionary song about a spiritual movement, and also about my spiritual change, going from one place to another because of my son."

Throughout The Miseducation of Lauryn Hill, several interludes of a teacher speaking to what is implied to be a classroom of children are played. The "teacher" was played by American poet and politician Ras Baraka speaking to a group of children in the living room of Hill's New Jersey home. Hill requested that Baraka speak to the children about the concept of love, to which he improvised in the lecture. Slant Magazines Paul Schrodt remarked on the title's reference to Carter G. Woodson's The Mis-Education of the Negro: "[Hill] adopts Woodson's thesis and makes it part of her own artistic process. Like the songs themselves, the intro/outro classroom scenes suggest a larger community working to redefine itself." Along with Woodson's book, the album's title was inspired by the film and autobiographical novel The Education of Sonny Carson.

Marketing and sales 
The Miseducation of Lauryn Hill was released on August 25, 1998. It was promoted with three singles—"Doo Wop (That Thing)", "Ex-Factor", and "Everything Is Everything"; all of which became hits and produced popular music videos. The album broke numerous sales records. In its first week, it debuted at number one on the Billboard 200, becoming the first album by a solo female rapper to peak or debut at number one in the US. Its first-week sales of over 422,000 copies broke the then record for female artists, previously held by Madonna's Ray of Light (1998), and became the first debut album by a female artist to debut at number one on the Billboard 200 chart, and additionally made Hill the first act to have debuted at number one on both the Billboard 200 and Hot 100 with their first entries on each chart. Its first-week sales remained the highest first-week sales for a debut album by a female artist in the 20th century, and the highest for a female rapper ever.

It topped the Billboard 200 for a second consecutive week, during which it sold 265,000 copies; and earned a gold certification by the Recording Industry Association of America (RIAA) after two weeks. In the United States, the album had sold one million copies in less than a month and 2.9 million copies by the end of the year, becoming one of the best-selling albums of 1998. Furthermore, it was the top rap album of the year according to Billboard, topping the Billboard Year-End Top R&B/Hip-Hop Albums chart, making it the only album by a female artist to accomplish this feat. In Ireland, the album became the first rap album to reach number one on the Irish Albums Chart. In Japan, it sold over one million copies in its first few months, and became one of the few million-certified albums by the Recording Industry Association of Japan.

The album's sales increased after Hill's appearance at the 41st Annual Grammy Awards, as it sold 234,000 more copies in the week of March 3, 1999, and 200,000 copies the following week. By August, it had sold 10 million copies worldwide, including nearly 700,000 in Canada. In April 2002, Columbia said that the album had sold 12 million copies worldwide, and by 2009, its global sales were reported to be 19 million copies. As of 2018, it is the most-streamed album released in 1998, on Spotify. The album also held the record for the longest-charting debut album by a female rapper on the Billboard 200, at 92 weeks, for over 21 years before being surpassed by Cardi B's Invasion of Privacy (2018). In 2021, it was certified diamond by the RIAA, earning Hill the Guinness World Record for being the first female rapper to reach RIAA diamond status. It was also reported that the album has sold 20 million copies worldwide according to Sony Music.

Tour 

Initially, there was no immediate tour planned due to the album not needing further promotion. Hill was also pregnant again with a child due in September 1998. Her first live performances of the songs were at Saturday Night Live and the Billboard Music Awards. In January 1999, Hill recruited a band and began rehearsals for what would become The Miseducation Tour. Tickets sold out as soon as the tour was announced.

The tour began at Budokan in Tokyo on January 21, 1999. Hill performed there again the following night, and played at two other Tokyo venues in the following week. One week later, she flew to London for her performance at the Brixton Academy on February 8. With 20 US dates total, the American part of the tour, which featured Outkast as the opening act, started on February 18 in Detroit, and ended on April 1 in Hill's hometown of Newark, New Jersey. She began the tour's 14-date European leg on May 13, when she performed at the Oslo Spektrum in Norway, closing on June 2 at the Manchester Arena in England. She then returned to Japan, where the tour was completed.

Hill did not want an extensive tour because of obligations to her family and the difficulties she experienced touring with the Fugees in 1996, which she found desensitizing and isolating. According to Hill biographer Chris Nickson in 1999, "there was the possibility of more dates being added ... but it was unlikely that Lauryn would be willing to make the tour more grueling and draining. She'd come to know that there was much more to life than a career."

Critical reception 

The Miseducation of Lauryn Hill was met with widespread critical acclaim; according to Los Angeles Times journalist Geoff Boucher, it was the most acclaimed album of 1998. Reviewers frequently praised Hill's presentation of a female's view on life and love. Eric Weisbard from Spin called her a "genre-bender" whose confident singing and rapping was balanced by vulnerable themes and sentiment. In The New York Times, Ann Powers found it "miraculous" and "exceptional" for Hill to use "her faith, based more in experience and feeling than in doctrine," as a means of connecting "the sacred to the secular in music that touches the essence of soul." AllMusic's John Bush was impressed by how she produced most of the album, "not as a crossover record, but as a collection of overtly personal and political statements", while demonstrating "performing talents, vocal range, and songwriting smarts". David Browne, writing in Entertainment Weekly, called it "an album of often-astonishing power, strength, and feeling", as well as "one of the rare hip-hop soul albums" to not lose focus with frivolous guest appearances. Browne applauded Hill's artistic vision and credited her for "easily flowing from singing to rapping, evoking the past while forging a future of her own". Dream Hampton of The Village Voice said she seamlessly "travels her realm within any given song", while Chicago Tribune critic Greg Kot deemed the record a "vocal tour de force" with arrangements that "bristle with great ideas". XXL gave the album a perfect "XXL" rating, with the magazine saying that it "not only verifies [Hill] as the most exciting voice of a young, progressive hip-hop nation, it raises the standards for it."

In a less enthusiastic review, Q magazine's Dom Phillips felt the music's only flaw was "a lack of memorable melody" on some songs that did not use interesting samples, while John Mulvey from NME quibbled about what he felt were redundant skits and Hill's "propensity" for histrionics and declarations of "how brilliant God is" on an otherwise "essential" album. Pitchforks Neil Lieberman found some of the ballads tedious and the melodies "cheesy". Citing "Lost Ones" and "Superstar" as highlights, The Village Voice music editor Robert Christgau deemed it the "PC record of the year", featuring exceptionally understated production and skillful rapping but also inconsistent lyrics, average singing, and superfluous skits. He appreciated the "knowledge [and] moral authority" of Hill's perspective and values, although he lamented her appraisal of God on record. In the Los Angeles Times, Soren Baker believed Hill was more effective as a critical rapper than a singer on the more emotional songs, where her voice was "too thin to carry such heavy subject matter".

Accolades 
At the end of 1998, The Miseducation of Lauryn Hill topped numerous critics polls of the year's best albums, including Rolling Stone, Billboard, Spin, and Time. It was also voted the second best record of the year in the Pazz & Jop, an annual poll of American critics published in The Village Voice. Hill was nominated ten times for the 1999 Grammy Awards, making her the first woman to ever be nominated that many times in one year. She won five Grammys, including awards in the Best New Artist, Best R&B Song, Best Female R&B Vocal Performance, and Best R&B Album categories. The Miseducation of Lauryn Hill also won the Grammy Award for Album of the Year, making it the first hip hop album to ever receive that award. Hill set a new record in the industry, as she also became the first woman to win five Grammys in one night. Hill was the big winner of the night at the 1999 MTV Video Music Awards, taking home four Moonmen, including Best Female Video and Video of the Year, for the music video for her single "Doo Wop (That Thing)", becoming the first hip hop video to win the award. It also earned her nominations at the NAACP Image Awards for Outstanding Female Artist, Outstanding Album, and Outstanding Song ("Doo Wop (That Thing)"). At the Billboard Music Awards, the record won in the R&B Album of the Year category, while "Doo Wop" won Best R&B/Urban New Artist Clip, and at the 1999 American Music Awards, Hill won the award for Best New Soul/R&B artist. She also won a Soul Train award and received a nomination for Best International Female Solo Artist at the Brit Awards.

The Miseducation of Lauryn Hill has since appeared on a number of lists ranking the greatest albums ever; according to Acclaimed Music, it is the 113th most acclaimed album based on such rankings.

Lawsuit 
Though The Miseducation of Lauryn Hill was largely a collaborative work between Hill and a group of musicians known as New Ark (Vada Nobles, Rasheem Pugh, Tejumold Newton, and Johari Newton), there was "label pressure to do the Prince thing," wherein all tracks would be credited as "written and produced by" the artist with little outside help. While recording the album, Hill was against the idea of creating documentation defining each musician's role.

In 1998, New Ark filed a 50-page lawsuit against Hill, her management and her record label, stating that Hill "used their songs and production skills, but failed to properly credit them for the work." The musicians claimed to be the primary songwriters on two tracks, and major contributors on several others, though Gordon Williams, the album's mixer and engineer, described the project as a "powerfully personal effort by Hill ... It was definitely her vision." Audio engineer Tony Prendatt, who also worked on the album, defended Hill, with a statement saying "Lauryn's genius is her own". In response to the lawsuit, Hill claimed that New Ark took advantage of her success. New Ark requested partial writing credits and monetary reimbursement. The suit was eventually settled out of court in February 2001 for a reported $5 million.

Impact 

Following the success of The Miseducation of Lauryn Hill, Hill rose to international superstardom and established herself as a pioneering woman in hip-hop, as magazines ranging from Harper's Bazaar to Esquire to Teen People vied to place her on their front covers. In 1999, she was described as a "Hip Hop icon" by Jet. Music Journalist Brandon Tensley argued that she achieved "icon status through the strength of her debut solo album alone."

Radio personality Ed Lover argued that The Miseducation of Lauryn Hill offered a different perspective from other woman in hip-hop, who generally rapped about sex or being "rugged" and "rough" at the time of its release. "Women tuned into her like she was a Ms. Luther King" according to American rapper Redman, while further adding that the album "made women cocky" and empowered them. Journalist Danyel Smith stated that it "dragged rap back to the land of the living after the twin drive-by murders of Tupac Shakur (1996) and Notorious B.I.G. (1997)".

In a February 8, 1999, Time cover-story, Hill was credited for helping fully assimilate hip-hop into mainstream music, and became the first hip-hop artist to ever appear on the magazine's front cover. Later that month, Hill broke numerous records at the 41st Annual Grammy Awards. Among the awards she received that night was Album of the Year, which has often been recognized as the most prestigious award in American music, and marked the first time a hip-hop artist won the award. According to music executive Clive Davis, the win helped the Grammy Awards become more accepting of rap and hip hop music. Former senior music editor for Amazon, Pete Hilgendorf stated it marked the start of when "the progression of R&B moving into hip-hop became evident".

The Rough Guide to Rock (2003) hailed the album as the "ultimate cross-over album of the hip-hop era". The album has been cited as one of the earliest to fully blend rapping and singing, with Genius dubbing Hill as "the first superstar to excel at both singing and rapping". Writing for The New York Times in 2018, Journalist Jon Caramanica noted that by "the mid-to-late 2000s, singing became a full-fledged part of hip-hop, owing to the success of Drake, one of the first stars —Lauryn Hill got there earlier — who toggled cleanly between rapping and singing and understood them as variations of each other, not oppositional forces. Rappers are singers now, to the point where the framework of singing has been refracted almost wholly through the needs of hip-hop."

According to rapper Jay-Z, with the album, Hill "made something that's going to stand the test of time." Cyndi Lauper argued that the album "changed everything and everybody. Lauryn Hill changed phrasing. She started a whole new kind of singing, taking church and hip-hop and stirring it with this freaking great feeling and voice." Furthermore, singer Maxwell proclaimed that Hill "combined incredible songwriting and hip-hop seamlessly". When speaking to Pitchfork about the album's influence, rapper Vince Staples stated that "Nowadays we get a combination of singing and rapping in a lot of music. But back then, it was a risk. So for her to sing like that early on, combined with the subject matter, the arrangement of the album with its throughline, and how it just flows with you… it’s definitely a classic body of work." Janelle Monáe shared a similar sentiment arguing that Hill "was hip-hop and R&B, but nobody had used [the combination] in the way she did. She created something that we had never tasted before."

Along with Brown Sugar by D'Angelo, Erykah Badu's Baduizm, and Maxwell's Urban Hang Suite by Maxwell, The Miseducation of Lauryn Hill is considered to be one of the most important and definitive releases in the history of neo soul music. According to Ebony magazine, it brought the neo soul genre to the forefront of popular music, and became the genre's most critically acclaimed and popular album. The Encyclopedia of African American Music (2010), noted that "some tracks are based more in hip hop soul than neo soul, but the record is filled with live musicians and layered harmonies, and therefore it is a trendsetting record that connects modern hip hop, R&B, and classic soul music together, creating groundwork for what followed it in the neo soul genre."

AllHipHop mentioned that Hill "mothered a new breed of soul" with the album; while Kyle Anderson of MTV shared a similar sentiment, stating that the album "essentially gave birth to the genre now known as neo soul, which means you can trace the lineage of Alicia Keys, Erykah Badu, Jill Scott and dozens of others back to Hill's masterpiece." In conversation with the Los Angeles Times, about the success of the 1999 album Black Diamond by Angie Stone, editor Emil Wilbekin of Vibe stated "I think [1998’s] ‘The Miseducation of Lauryn Hill’ changed the way a lot of R&B; artists are presenting their music," and added "With Lauryn and Erykah Badu and D'Angelo and Maxwell, there’s been a return to live instruments, real singing and real love stories. I think Angie Stone is an outgrowth of that."

The Miseducation of Lauryn Hill "taught a generation about the power of baring your soul through song", according to Billboard. The album touched upon themes of love, heartbreak, and pregnancy, which added an newfound emotional element to hip-hop. Paving the way for artists like Kid Cudi and Kanye West to showcase vulnerability in their music, according to author Kathy Iandoli.

Chris Mench of Complex, wrote that the album "set a new standard for rap women, and even for rap in general", while adding that "its influence extends far beyond the genre walls of hip-hop. It's hard to imagine the rise of conscious artists like Lupe Fiasco or Kendrick Lamar without her, but it's equally as hard to picture widespread success for minimalist, soulful singers like Adele, Amy Winehouse, and even FKA twigs without Lauryn paving the way."

The Guardian heralded the album as "the high-water mark of the conscious hip-hop movement", and named it a "game-changing cri de coeur", while further adding that the album "channelled some precious learning for a generation or more of young women, black and white alike; one in which a ferociously talented artist preached self-determination and self-respect, self-knowledge and getting one's due. It was foremother to Beyoncé's Lemonade and Janelle Monáe's Dirty Computer". Journalist David Opie of Highsnobiety, affirmed that it has educated "pretty much everyone who's recorded music since" as well as "inspiring both newer artists and hip-hop stalwarts alike."

Tributes and anniversary projects 
Marvel Comics released a series of variant comic book covers inspired by influential contemporary rap albums, which included a reimagined Miseducation themed Ms. Marvel comic cover. San Francisco Bay Area music collective UnderCover Presents, formed by Yerba Buena Center for the Arts, released a Miseducation tribute album entitled UnderCover Presents: A Tribute to The Miseducation of Lauryn Hill (2017).

On The Miseducations fifteenth anniversary in 2013, American rapper Nas reviewed the album for XXL, hailing it as a model for artists of all genres to follow. He also called it "a timeless record, pure music", and said it "represents the time period—a serious moment in Black music, when young artists were taking charge and breaking through doors."

In 2018, Hill launched a North American tour to commemorate the album's 20th anniversary. Adele penned a letter referring to the album as  her "favorite record of all time", while noting that it represented "an honest representation of love and life", and added "I feel I can relate too but also I know there's elements and levels I never will be able to. Ms. Lauryn Hill was on form in every way possible. Thank you for the record of a lifetime, thank you for your wisdom! Thank you for existing. Happy 20th". American girl group TLC, spoke to Beats 1 about the album's influence, with Rozonda "Chilli" Thomas stating "I mean, she be in the videos sometimes pregnant, and sometimes not. She was doing it at a time where they would probably be like, “wait until you have your baby.” Whereas these days, a female artist — whether you're an actress or whatever — if you're pregnant, you celebrate that from the moment that you decide to share it with the world. She didn't care, she just did it. Her voice — to be able to rap like that and sing like that, she was and is unbelievably talented. There's nobody like Lauryn Hill."

In celebration of the album's 20th anniversary, Billboard interviewed 16 artists who have been inspired by the album, which included Jazmine Sullivan, Maggie Rogers, Rapsody, Normani, Chloe Bailey, Lizzo, Andra Day, Saweetie, Ella Mai, Teyana Taylor, Anne-Marie and more. The album was also the subject of author and journalist Joan Morgan's 2018 book She Begat This: 20 Years of 'The Miseducation of Lauryn Hill'. That same year, Spotify presented the Dear Ms. Hill art installation in Brooklyn, New York which saw fans, including H.E.R. and Kelly Rowland, submit letters about The Miseducation of Lauryn Hill, and then used those letters to turn them into paper art. Further, the Spotify podcast Dissect launched their first ever mini series, which examined the album and its impact. Hill also collaborated with Woolrich to design Miseducation inspired pieces for their 'American Soul Since 1830' collection, and starred in the accompanying campaign.

Legacy

Rankings and honors 
The album was the first in the history of XXL to receive a perfect "XXL" rating. In 2007, the album was placed on the Rock and Roll Hall of Fame's "200 Definitive Albums of All Time" list.  In 2015, The Miseducation of Lauryn Hill was deemed "culturally, historically, or aesthetically significant" by the Library of Congress and selected for inclusion in the National Recording Registry.

In 2017, The Miseducation of Lauryn Hill was among the first batch of albums to preserved in Harvard University's Loeb Music Library. That same year, NPR named it the second greatest album made by a woman. The album has also been included in the Smithsonian National Museum of African American history. While ranking it 314th on their "500 Greatest Albums of All Time", Rolling Stone credited Hill with taking 1970s soul and making it "boom and signify to the hip-hop generation". The magazine's placement of The Miseducation at number 10 on a revised edition in 2020 made it the highest ranking rap album on the list.

Influence on contemporaries 
Several artists have cited the album as an inspiration for their musical work including Omar Apollo, H.E.R., Ella Mai, Rachel Platten, and Macy Gray. Furthermore Ella Mai, Rihanna, H.E.R., Dan Smith of Bastille and Adele have all called The Miseducation of Lauryn Hill their personal favorite album. American entertainer Donald Glover stated that it's his most-listened to album, while Zendaya, along with rappers J. Cole and Kendrick Lamar have cited it as their favorite album by a female artist.

Producer Savan Kotecha told Vulture that he and Ariana Grande listened to The Miseducation of Lauryn Hill album during the recording of Grande's fourth studio album Sweetener. Kotecha stated that the chord changes in Grande's song "No Tears Left to Cry" was modeled after the album. Beyoncé cited Hill as one of her primary inspirations for her fourth album 4.

Talent manager Nick Shymansky, told BET that he was inspired to find a Lauryn Hill-like talent after being inspired by The Miseducation of Lauryn Hill, and eventually discovered Amy Winehouse in the early aughts. Winehouse eventually began working on her debut album Frank (2003), with many of the producers that Hill has worked with. Country singer Lucinda Williams stated that her album World Without Tears (2003) as well as its song "Righteously" were influenced by the album and its hip hop elements. Maroon 5's album Songs About Jane (2002) was also inspired by the LP, most notably on the track "Sweetest Goodbye" which drew from The Miseducation of Lauryn Hill song "Tell Him".

Multiple artists have titled their projects after the album including Freddie Gibbs (The Miseducation of Freddie Gibbs), Calboy & Lil Wayne ("Miseducation"), and Lil' Kim ("Mis-education of Lil' Kim"). Additional albums that were inspired by Hill include Daytona by Pusha T, The College Dropout by Kanye West, and Immunity by Clairo.

Reappraisal 

Jon Caramanica, writing in The Rolling Stone Album Guide (2004), called it "as earnest, unpretentious, and pleasantly sloppy an album as any woman of the hip-hop generation has ever made", and said that, by appealing to a wide spectrum of listeners with hip hop filtered through a "womanist lens", the album propelled Hill to superstardom "of epic proportions" and "the focal point at hip-hop's crossover into the mainstream."

The Miseducation of Lauryn Hill remains Hill's only studio album. After its success, the singer shunned her celebrity status and pursued a private life while raising six children, but both personal and professional difficulties followed. As Miami New Times journalist Juliana Accioly explained, "She was reported to have spent years on a spiritual quest while dealing with bipolar disorder. She was sued over songwriting credits. She served a three-month prison sentence in 2013 for tax evasion. She was deemed a diva for wanting to be called 'Ms. Hill' and criticized for her erratic performances." In October 2018, Hill embarked on a concert tour commemorating Miseducations 20th anniversary. In its anticipation, Accioly reflected on the album in the context of the Me Too movement of recent years: "Against that backdrop, Hill's own descriptions of mistreatment carry validation and support for victims. … For women who came up during Miseducations zenith, attending Hill's 2018 performance could serve as a measure of how much the world around them has changed — and how many things remain the same. Her crash course on life is still very much relevant: 'It could all be so simple,' but it's not."

Track listing 
All tracks are written by Lauryn Hill, except where noted. All tracks are produced by Hill. "Lost Ones" and "To Zion" were co-produced by Che Pope, and "Lost Ones" was additionally produced by Vada Nobles.

Personnel
Credits are adapted from the album's liner notes.

Musicians

Al Anderson – guitar 
Tom Barney – bass 
Bud Beadle – alto/tenor saxophone, flute 
Robert Browne – guitar 
Rudy Byrd – percussion 
Che Pope – drum programming 
Jared Crawford – live drums 
D'Angelo – Rhodes piano 
DJ Supreme – DJ 
Francis Dunnery – guitar 
Paul Fakhourie – bass 
Dean Frasier –  saxophone 
Loris Holland – keys ; clavinet 
Indigo Quartet – strings 
Julian Marley – guitar 
Chris Meredith – bass 
Johari Newton – guitar 
Tejumold Newton – piano 
Vada Nobles – drum programming 
Arun Pandian – guitar 
Grace Paradise – harp 
James Poyser – bass ; keys 
Everol Ray – trumpet 
Kevin Robinson – trumpet, flugelhorn 
Ronald "Nambo" Robinson – trombone 
Matthew Rubano – bass 
Carlos Santana – guitar 
Earl Chinna Smith – guitar 
Andrew Smith – guitar 
Squiddly Ranks – live drums 
John R. Stephens – piano 
Elizabeth Valletti – harp 
Fayyaz Virti – trombone 
Joe Wilson – piano 
Stuart Zender – bass

Production

Errol Brown – assistant recording engineer 
Che Pope – co-producer 
Lauryn Hill – producer, executive producer 
Matt Howe – recorder 
Storm Jefferson – recorder ; mix engineer ; assistant mix engineer 
Ken Johnson –  recorder ; assistant recording engineer 
Vada Nobles – co-producer 
Tony Prendatt – recorder ; engineer 
Warren Riker – recorder ; mix engineer 
Jamie Seigel – assistant mix engineer 
Greg Thompson – assistant mix engineer 
Neil Tucker – assistant recording engineer 
Chip Verspyck – assistant recording engineer 
Brian Vibberts – assistant engineer 
Gordon "Commissioner Gordon" Williams – recorder ; engineer ; mixer 
Johny Wyndrx – recorder

Vocalists

Lauryn Hill – vocals 
Mary J. Blige – vocals 
D'angelo – vocals 
Shelley Thunder – vocals 
Kenny Bobien – backing vocals 
Chinah – backing vocals 
Jenni Fujita – backing vocals 
Fundisha Johnson – backing vocals 
Sabrina Johnston – backing vocals 
Jenifer McNeil – backing vocals 
Rasheem Pugh – backing vocals 
Lenesha Randolph – backing vocals 
Ramon Rivera – backing vocals 
Earl Robinson – backing vocals 
Andrea Simmons – backing vocals 
Eddie Stockley – backing vocals 
Ahmed Wallace – backing vocals 
Tara Watkins – backing vocals 
Rachel Wilson – backing vocals 
Chuck Young – backing vocals

Charts

Weekly charts

Year-end charts

Decade-end charts

Certifications

See also
 Billboard Year-End
 List of Billboard 200 number-one albums of 1998
 List of number-one R&B albums of 1998 (U.S.)
 List of number-one R&B albums of 1999 (U.S.)
 List of best-selling albums in the United States

References 
Footnotes

Bibliography

Further reading 
 Laura Checkoway, "Inside The Miseducation of Lauryn Hill", Rolling Stone, August 26, 2008.

External links 
 

1998 debut albums
Lauryn Hill albums
Albums involved in plagiarism controversies
Albums produced by Lauryn Hill
Albums recorded at Chung King Studios
Columbia Records albums
Concept albums
Grammy Award for Album of the Year
Grammy Award for Best R&B Album
Ruffhouse Records albums
United States National Recording Registry recordings
United States National Recording Registry albums
Progressive rap albums